Mi Verdad ("My truth") is the seventh album recorded by Mexican singer Alejandro Fernández. Produced by Pedro Ramírez, this album marks the return to the genre that opened the doors for his success. Videos were created for the songs "Loco" and "Nadie Simplemente Nadie". It received a nomination for a Grammy Award for Best Mexican/Mexican-American Album.

Track listing 
 La Lluvia Sigue Cayendo (Manuel Monterrosas) - 3:54
 Loco (Jorge Massias) - 3:16
 Si He Sabido Amor (Humberto Estrada) - 3:53
 Avísame (Manuel Monterrosas) - 2:59
 Hoy Que Estás Ausente (Manuel Monterrosas) - 3:48
 Mi Verdad (Kike Santander) - 2:12
 Mentirosos (Homero Aguilar) - 3:18
 Nadie Simplemente Nadie (Susana Fernández) - 3:44
 A Una Señora (Manuel Monterrosas) - 2:55
 ¿Por Qué? (Manuel Eduardo Castro) - 2:42
 Esta Noche (Manuel Eduardo Castro) - 2:54
 Amante Torero (Alejandro Dávila, Luis Ramos) - 3:28
 Así Como Soy, Yo Soy (Manuel Monterrosas) - 2:31

Chart performance

Album

Singles

Sales and certifications

References 

1999 albums
Alejandro Fernández albums
Latin Grammy Award for Best Ranchero/Mariachi Album